James B. Lowe (1880-1963) was an American stage and screen actor who was best known for his role in the 1927 film adaptation of Uncle Tom's Cabin.

Biography 
James was born in Macon, Georgia, to James B. Lowe Sr. and Rachel Burton. As a young man, among other jobs, he reportedly worked as a gold miner in Alaska.

He first began a career as a stage actor before beginning to appear in movies in the mid-1920s. After a few minor roles, he took the lead in Uncle Tom's Cabin after fellow theatre actor Charles Gilpin dropped out of the picture. Although the film — and Lowe's performance — received favorable reviews among the general public at the time of its release, it has since been cited as the originator of the Uncle Tom stereotype.

After the success of Uncle Tom's Cabin, he returned to theatrical work, receiving rave notices for his role in plays like The South Before the War in Europe. In 1941, after working in Paris for over a decade, he returned to the United States, settling in Los Angeles and setting up shop as a tailor next to the Dunbar Hotel. He died in 1963.

Selected filmography 

 Uncle Tom's Cabin (1927)
 Should Sleepwalkers Marry? (1926)
 Hour of Reckoning (1926)
 Blue Blazes (1926)
 The Demon Rider (1925)

References 

American male film actors
1880 births
1963 deaths
Male actors from Georgia (U.S. state)
Actors from Macon, Georgia